Cardiovascular Toxicology is a quarterly peer-reviewed scientific journal covering molecular aspects of cardiovascular disease. It was established in 2001 and is published by Springer Science+Business Media. The editor-in-chief is Y. James Kang (University of Louisville School of Medicine). According to the Journal Citation Reports, the journal has a 2020 impact factor of 3.239.

References

External links

Cardiology journals
Toxicology journals
Springer Science+Business Media academic journals
Publications established in 2001
English-language journals
Quarterly journals